, (Miyako: Ffyama) is one of the Miyako Islands of Okinawa Prefecture, Japan. It is connected to Miyako-jima via 1,690m Kurima Bridge.

Gallery

See also

References

External links

 Miyakojima Website about Kurima-jima (Japanese)

Miyako Islands
Islands of Okinawa Prefecture